Talamri (also spelled Tell Amri) is a town in central Syria, administratively part of the Homs Governorate, located northeast of Homs. According to the Central Bureau of Statistics (CBS), Talamri had a population of 895 in the 2004 census. The inhabitants of the village are ethnic Circassians from the Abzakh, Shapsugh, Kabardian and Bzhedug tribes.

References

Populated places in Homs District
Circassian communities in Syria